Emil de Cou is an American conductor who became associate conductor of the National Symphony Orchestra (John F. Kennedy Center for the Performing Arts) in September 2003. He has led the orchestra on residency tours in five states, in subscription concerts at the Kennedy Center and on the West Lawn of the United States Capitol Building. In 2005 de Cou was named NSO at Wolf Trap Festival Conductor and will start his 15th season with that organization in the summer of 2019. He was appointed the music director of the Pacific Northwest Ballet starting with the 2011-2012 season. In 2013, he was described  by New York Times critic Alastair Macaulay to be "probably...America’s finest ballet conductor."

Emil de Cou also acts as musical advisor to NASA. In June, 2018 de Cou led performances at the Kennedy Center to commemorate the 60th anniversary of the founding of the space agency called "Space, the Next Frontier." This was the 12th collaboration between the National Symphony Orchestra and NASA.

De Cou is a resident of San Francisco where he was Principal Pops Conductor of the San Francisco Symphony and acting music director of the San Francisco Ballet Orchestra.

De Cou has recorded extensively including world premiere recordings of Claude Debussy's original version of Printemps Suite Symphonique, the orchestral version of Suite Bergamasque, Charles Griffes's  The Kairn of Koridwen, and Elliot Goldenthal's Othello (ballet).

Award
For his ongoing work with NASA, de Cou was awarded the NASA Exceptional Public Achievement Medal by Administrator Charles F. Bolden, Jr. at the NSO at Wolf Trap performance of The Planets in July 2012, the first musician to receive that honor.

Notes

External links 
 Emil de Cou 
 picture
 Washington Post

American male conductors (music)
Living people
Musicians from Los Angeles
Year of birth missing (living people)
20th-century American conductors (music)
21st-century American conductors (music)
Classical musicians from California
20th-century American male musicians
21st-century American male musicians